Pseudochalcura is a genus of chalcid wasps in the family Eucharitidae. There are about 14 described species in Pseudochalcura.

Species
These 14 species belong to the genus Pseudochalcura:

 Pseudochalcura americana (Howard, 1894) c g
 Pseudochalcura atra Heraty, 1986 c g
 Pseudochalcura carinata g
 Pseudochalcura chilensis Kieffer, 1905 c g
 Pseudochalcura condylus Heraty, 1986 c g
 Pseudochalcura excruciata Heraty, 1986 c g
 Pseudochalcura frustrata Heraty, 1986 c g
 Pseudochalcura gibbosa (Provancher, 1881) c g b
 Pseudochalcura liburna Heraty, 1985 c g
 Pseudochalcura nigrocyanea Ashmead, 1904 c g
 Pseudochalcura pauca Heraty, 1986 c g
 Pseudochalcura prolata Heraty, 1986 c g
 Pseudochalcura sculpturata Heraty, 1985 c g
 Pseudochalcura septuosa Heraty, 1986 c g

Data sources: i = ITIS, c = Catalogue of Life, g = GBIF, b = Bugguide.net

References

Further reading

External links

 

Parasitic wasps
Chalcidoidea